Dame Hermione Lee,  (born 29 February 1948) is a British biographer, literary critic and academic. She is a former President of Wolfson College, Oxford, and a former Goldsmiths' Professor of English Literature in the University of Oxford and Professorial Fellow of New College. She is a Fellow of the British Academy and of the Royal Society of Literature.

Early life and education
Born in Winchester, Hampshire, Lee grew up in London, where her father was a GP. She was educated at the Lycée Français Charles de Gaulle, City of London School for Girls, and Queen's College, London. She took a first-class degree in English Literature at St Hilda's College, Oxford, in 1968 and an MPhil at St Cross College, Oxford, in 1970.

Academic career
Lee has taught at the College of William and Mary in Virginia, at the University of Liverpool (where she was awarded an Honorary DLitt in 2002) and at the University of York, from 1977 to 1998, where she held a personal chair in the Department of English and Related Literature, and where she received an Honorary DLitt in 2007. 
Since 1998, she has been the Goldsmiths' Professor of English Literature and the first woman Professorial Fellow of New College, Oxford. She succeeded Sir Gareth Roberts as the sixth President of Wolfson College, Oxford, in 2008, serving until the end of academic year 2016–17. She is a lifetime Honorary Fellow of the Rothermere American Institute at the University of Oxford.

Honours and fellowships
Lee is a Fellow of the British Academy, a Fellow of the Royal Society of Literature, a Fellow of the Rothermere American Institute, University of Oxford, an Honorary Fellow of St Hilda's and St Cross College, Oxford; and a member of the Athenaeum Club.

Appointed a Commander of the Order of the British Empire (CBE) in 2003 for services to literature, Lee was promoted to Dame Commander (DBE) in the 2013 Birthday Honours for services to literary scholarship, and again to Dame Grand Cross (GBE) in the 2023 New Year Honours for services to English literature.

In the US, Lee has been a Visiting Fellow teaching at the Beinecke Library at Yale University, a Whitney J. Oates Fellow at the Council for the Humanities at Princeton, an Everett Helm Visiting Fellow at the Lilly Library at the Indiana University at Bloomington, and the Mel and Lois Tukman Fellow of the New York Public Library's Cullman Center for Scholars and Writers in 2004–05. In 2003, she became a Foreign Honorary Member of the American Academy of Arts and Sciences.

Writing
Lee has written widely on women writers, American literature, life-writing, and modern fiction. Her books include The Novels of Virginia Woolf (1977); a study of the Anglo-Irish novelist Elizabeth Bowen (1981, revised 1999); a short critical book, the first published in Britain, on Philip Roth (1982) and a critical biography of the American novelist Willa Cather, Willa Cather: A Life Saved Up (1989, reissued in a revised edition by Virago in 2008).

She published a major biography of Virginia Woolf (1996), which won the British Academy Rose Mary Crawshay Prize, and was named as one of The New York Times Book Review′s best books of 1997.

Lee has published a collection of essays on biography and autobiography, Body Parts: Essays on Life-Writing (2005), and a biography of Edith Wharton, published to mixed reviews in 2007 by Chatto & Windus and Knopf. In 2013 the playwright Tom Stoppard asked her to write his biography. It was published in 2020.

She has edited and introduced numerous editions and anthologies of Kipling, Trollope, Virginia Woolf, Stevie Smith, Elizabeth Bowen, Willa Cather, Eudora Welty, and Penelope Fitzgerald. She was one of the co-editors of the Oxford Poets Anthologies from 1999 to 2002.

Lee is also known for her reviews, including for The Guardian, The New York Review of Books, and her work in the media. From 1982 to 1986, she presented Channel Four's first books programme, Book Four, and she contributes regularly to Front Row and other radio arts programmes. She chaired the Judges for the Man Booker Prize for Fiction in 2006, and has judged many other literary prizes. She has served on the literature advisory panels of the Arts Council and the British Council.

Personal life
Lee is married to Professor John Barnard, Professor Emeritus of the University of Leeds.

Awards

 1997 – Rose Mary Crawshay Prize for Virginia Woolf
 2003 – Commander of the Order of the British Empire (CBE)
 2013 – Dame Commander of the Order of the British Empire (DBE)
 2013 – James Tait Black Memorial Prize for Penelope Fitzgerald: A Life
 2015 – Plutarch Award for Penelope Fitzgerald: A Life
 2023 – Dame Grand Cross of the Order of the British Empire (GBE)

Partial bibliography
The Novels of Virginia Woolf (1977)
Elizabeth Bowen: An Estimation (1981)
Philip Roth (1982)
Willa Cather: Double Lives (1989)
Virginia Woolf (1996)
Body Parts: Essays on Life-Writing (2002)
Virginia Woolf's Nose: Essays on Biography (2005)
Edith Wharton (2007)
Biography: A Very Short Introduction (2009)
Penelope Fitzgerald: A Life (2013)
Lives of Houses (editor, with Kate Kennedy, 2020)
Tom Stoppard: A Life (2020)

References

External links

Wolfson Presidency

"Queen's birthday honours list 2013: GCB, DBE and CBE", The Guardian, 15 June 2013.

1948 births
Living people
People educated at Lycée Français Charles de Gaulle
People educated at Queen's College, London
People educated at the City of London School for Girls
Alumni of St Hilda's College, Oxford
Alumni of St Cross College, Oxford
Academics of the University of Liverpool
Academics of the University of York
Dames Grand Cross of the Order of the British Empire
English biographers
English critics
Fellows of New College, Oxford
Fellows of the Royal Society of Literature
Fellows of the British Academy
Fellows of the American Academy of Arts and Sciences
Presidents of Wolfson College, Oxford
Rose Mary Crawshay Prize winners
Writers from London